Higher Poynton was a railway station serving the eastern side of the town of Poynton in Cheshire, England. It was opened in 1869 by the Macclesfield, Bollington and Marple Railway (MB&M) - a joint line constructed and operated by the Manchester, Sheffield and Lincolnshire Railway (MS&L) and North Staffordshire Railways (NSR).

History

Initially, the station was known simply as Poynton; however, in some MS&L timetables, it was described as Poynton for Lyme Park.

The station buildings were built to NSR designs, as were most other structures on the MB&M, while train services were operated by the MS&L (later the GCR).

Much of the goods revenue for the station came from the coal mines and, when these closed in the 1920s, the track on the spur leading off the line to the collieries was lifted.

To avoid confusion with Poynton railway station, on the main line between Manchester Piccadilly and Stoke-on-Trent, the station was renamed Higher Poynton in 1930.  During the Second World War, the signal box at Higher Poynton was only operational as required for shunting; most of the time, it remained shut saving the need to employ three signalmen. The station also employed two female porters for the duration of the war and a short period after.

The station closed in January 1970, when the line between Macclesfield and Marple closed; the buildings were demolished and the track was lifted by the end of spring 1971.

Today

The trackbed now forms part of the Middlewood Way, a shared use path between Macclesfield and Marple; it was opened by David Bellamy in 1985. A car park is located close by and the trackbed is a picnic site; the platforms are still extant, which walkers and cyclists use to pass through the former station site.

References
Notes

Sources

External links
Disused stations - Higher Poynton (photos, maps, etc)

Railway stations in Great Britain opened in 1869
Railway stations in Great Britain closed in 1970
Disused railway stations in Cheshire
Former Macclesfield Committee stations
Poynton
1869 establishments in England
Beeching closures in England